Barakovo (Macedonian Cyrillic: Бараково) is a village in the municipality of Demir Hisar, North Macedonia. It is situated between the villages of Edinakovci and Graište.

Demographics
According to the 2002 census, the village had a total of 67 inhabitants. Ethnic groups in the village include:

Macedonians 66
Serbs 1

References

Villages in Demir Hisar Municipality